This is a list of people (real or fictional) appearing on the cover of Rolling Stone magazine in the 2000s. This list is for the regular biweekly issues of the magazine, including variant covers, and does not include special issues. Issue numbers that include a slash (XXX/YYY) are combined double issues.

2000

2001

2002

2003

2004

2005

2006

2007

2008

2009

References

Sources
 Rolling Stone Coverwall 1967-2013
 Rolling Stone: 1,000 Covers: A History of the Most Influential Magazine in Pop Culture, New York, NY: Abrams, 2006. 
 Rolling Stone: 50 Years of Covers: A History of the Most Influential Magazine in Pop Culture, New York, NY: Abrams, 2018. 

Lists of actors
Lists of entertainers
Lists of musicians
2000s